Raúl "Tinajón" Feliciano Rodríguez (July 31, 1930 – July 17, 2016) was a Puerto Rican professional basketball player and lawyer. He played basketball professionally in Puerto Rico in the Baloncesto Superior Nacional (BSN).

Basketball career 
Feliciano made his debut in the Baloncesto Superior Nacional (BSN) league in 1947 with the UPR of Río Piedras, averaging 7.78 points in 14 games. He was the BSN Scoring Champion from 1948 to 1952 before Fufi Santori became the scoring champion in 1953. His scoring ability began a media coverage not seen before in the Baloncesto Superior Nacional (BSN) and prompted a new record assistance of 114,468 paying fans for the BSN league. He finished his career with 4,719 points in the Baloncesto Superior Nacional. In the process he became the first player in the BSN to score 40 or more points in a basketball game, a feat he achieved with the Gallitos de la UPR on September 5, 1949, scoring 46 points in the triumph, 83–66, against the Cardenales de Río Piedras. Similarly, he was the first to average over 20 points per game in a season in the BSN league.

Feliciano became the first Puerto Rican basketball player to receive offers from National Basketball Association teams such as the Baltimore Bullets and the New York Knicks. His offensive profile included two main shots: a right hook shot and the jumpshot.

Personal life 
Feliciano was born in Ciales, Puerto Rico on July 31, 1930. At an early age, he became interested in basketball and played at the Escuela Superior de Río Piedras. In 1945 Feliciano began his studies at the University of Puerto Rico, Río Piedras Campus. At age 18, he graduated in Business Administration and two years later as a lawyer. Feliciano died on July 17, 2016 at his home in San Juan, Puerto Rico.

References

External links 
Statistics in BSN
 Stats and Teams
 Interview of Raul Feliciano in 2010

1930 births
2016 deaths
Baloncesto Superior Nacional players
People from Ciales, Puerto Rico
Puerto Rican men's basketball players
Puerto Rico men's national basketball team players
Central American and Caribbean Games bronze medalists for Puerto Rico
Competitors at the 1954 Central American and Caribbean Games
Centers (basketball)
Central American and Caribbean Games medalists in basketball